Dooly County is a county located in the central portion of the U.S. state of Georgia. As of the 2020 census, the population was 11,208. The county seat is Vienna. The county was created by an act of the Georgia General Assembly on May 15, 1821, and named for Colonel John Dooly, a Georgia American Revolutionary War fighter. It was one of the original landlot counties created from land ceded from the Creek Nation.

The entire county of Crisp and parts of Macon, Pulaski, Turner, Wilcox and Worth counties were formed from Dooly's original borders.

Geography
The county is located in the upper Atlantic coastal plain region of the state.

The western two-thirds of Dooly County, from west of Unadilla south to Pinehurst, then to the southeastern corner of the county, is located in the Middle Flint River sub-basin of the ACF River Basin (Apalachicola-Chattahoochee-Flint River Basin). The northeastern and eastern portion of Dooly County is located in the Lower Ocmulgee River sub-basin of the Altamaha River basin. The very southeastern corner of the county is located in the Alapaha River sub-basin of the Suwannee River basin.

Major highways

  Interstate 75
  U.S. Route 41
  State Route 7
  State Route 27
  State Route 90
  State Route 215
  State Route 230
  State Route 230 Connector
  State Route 257
  State Route 329
  State Route 401 (unsigned designation for I-75)

Adjacent counties
 Houston County - northeast
 Pulaski County - east
 Wilcox County - southeast
 Crisp County - south
 Sumter County - west
 Macon County - northwest

Demographics

2000 census
As of the census of 2000, there were 11,525 people, 3,909 households, and 2,767 families living in the county.  The population density was 29 people per square mile (11/km2).  There were 4,499 housing units at an average density of 12 per square mile (4/km2).  The racial makeup of the county was 45.97% White, 49.54% Black or African American, 0.16% Native American, 0.43% Asian, 0.11% Pacific Islander, 2.88% from other races, and 0.91% from two or more races.  4.66% of the population were Hispanic or Latino of any race.

There were 3,909 households, out of which 33.60% had children under the age of 18 living with them, 45.10% were married couples living together, 20.50% had a female householder with no husband present, and 29.20% were non-families. 25.90% of all households were made up of individuals, and 11.40% had someone living alone who was 65 years of age or older.  The average household size was 2.62 and the average family size was 3.14.

In the county, the population was spread out, with 25.60% under the age of 18, 10.30% from 18 to 24, 29.80% from 25 to 44, 22.50% from 45 to 64, and 11.80% who were 65 years of age or older.  The median age was 35 years. For every 100 females there were 109.50 males.  For every 100 females age 18 and over, there were 111.70 males.

The median income for a household in the county was $27,980, and the median income for a family was $35,337. Males had a median income of $26,670 versus $19,076 for females. The per capita income for the county was $13,628.  About 18.00% of families and 22.10% of the population were below the poverty line, including 29.50% of those under age 18 and 21.20% of those age 65 or over.

2010 census
As of the 2010 United States Census, there were 14,918 people, 5,286 households, and 3,576 families living in the county. The racial makeup of the county was 49.9% black or African American, 45.6% white, 0.6% Asian, 0.1% American Indian, 2.8% from other races, and 0.9% from two or more races. Those of Hispanic or Latino origin made up 5.8% of the population. In terms of ancestry, 8.9% were American, and 8.7% were English.

Of the 5,286 households, 31.3% had children under the age of 18 living with them, 43.2% were married couples living together, 19.1% had a female householder with no husband present, 32.3% were non-families, and 28.8% of all households were made up of individuals. The average household size was 2.45 and the average family size was 2.99. The median age was 40.0 years.

The median income for a household in the county was $31,038 and the median income for a family was $39,622. Males had a median income of $36,344 versus $27,557 for females. The per capita income for the county was $14,871. About 21.0% of families and 27.1% of the population were below the poverty line, including 41.9% of those under age 18 and 22.3% of those age 65 or over.

2020 census

The 2020 United States Census indicated that the county lost 29% of its population in the preceding decade. This was the largest percentage loss of any county in the state.

As of the 2020 United States census, there were 11,208 people, 5,020 households, and 3,350 families residing in the county.

Economy 

The Big Pig Jig, Georgia's official State Barbecue Cooking Championship, is held annually in Fall in Dooly County and attracts a national audience.  The county is also notable for cotton and peanut production.

Education

Dooly County Elementary School
Dooly County Middle school
Dooly County  High School
http://www.dooly.k12.ga.us/

Communities
 Byromville
 Dooling
 Lilly
 Pinehurst
 Unadilla
 Vienna (county seat)

Politics

Notable people
 John Dooly after whom the county was named
 Rooney L. Bowen, Georgia businessman and politician
 George Busbee, governor of Georgia
 Walter F. George, U.S. Senator
 Jody Powell, press secretary and aide to Jimmy Carter
 Roger Kingdom, Olympic gold medalist in track and field
 David Ragan, NASCAR driver
 Keith Mumphery, NFL player
 Julian Webb, judge on the Georgia Court of Appeals and member of the Georgia State Senate.

See also

 National Register of Historic Places listings in Dooly County, Georgia
List of counties in Georgia

References

External links
 Georgia.gov Dooly County history
 GeorgiaInfo Dooly County Courthouse info
 Dooly County historical marker

 
1821 establishments in Georgia (U.S. state)
Populated places established in 1821
Georgia (U.S. state) counties
Majority-minority counties in Georgia